Biełki  (Bilky) is a village in the administrative district of Gmina Milejczyce, within Siemiatycze County, Podlaskie Voivodeship, in north-eastern Poland.

References

Villages in Siemiatycze County